Raymond van Uytven (Leuven, 1 February 1933 – Halle-Booienhoven, 20 December 2018) was a Belgian medievalist, a specialist in the economic and urban history of the medieval Duchy of Brabant, who was a professor at the University of Antwerp and the University of Leuven.

Life
Van Uytven studied at the Catholic University there. He earned a Ph.D. in 1959 with a thesis on the city finances and urban economy of Leuven between the 12th and 16th centuries. After a number of years working at the National Archives of Belgium, he obtained a university appointment. A Festschrift was published at his retirement in 1998. He died at home in Halle-Booienhoven (Zoutleeuw) on 20 December 2018.

Publications
 "Splendour or Wealth: Art and Economy in the Burgundian Netherlands", Transactions of the Cambridge Bibliographical Society, 10:2 (1992), pp. 101-123.
 De zinnelijke middeleeuwen (1998)
 "Showing off one's rank in the Middle Ages", in Showing Status: Representation of Social Positions in the Late Middle Ages, edited by Wim Blockmans (Turnhout, 1999), pp. 19-34.
 Studies over Brabantse kloostergeschiedenis (Brussels, Algemeen Rijksarchief, 1999)
 Production and Consumption in the Low Countries, 13th-16th Centuries (2001)
 De papegaai van de paus (2003)
 as editor: Geschiedenis van Brabant van het hertogdom tot heden (2004)
 Geschiedenis van de dorst: Twintig eeuwen drinken in de Lage Landen (2007)
 Smaken verschillen (2010)

References

1933 births
2018 deaths
Politicians from Leuven
Catholic University of Leuven (1834–1968) alumni
Belgian medievalists
Academic staff of the University of Antwerp